Leptotrombidium myotis is a species of mites in the family Trombiculidae that parasitizes bats.
Species that it affects include the Arizona myotis, little brown bat, and northern long-eared bat.

References

Animals described in 1929
Trombiculidae
Parasites of bats